Bradley Raymond Parker (born 23 April 1980) is a Canadian former soccer player who played at both professional and international levels as a defender and midfielder.

Career

Club career
Born in Scarborough, Ontario, Parker played club football with Dutch club Feyenoord. In June 2000, he was on trial with Belgian club RWD Molenbeek, and he finally left Feyenoord in July 2001 after five years with the club. After leaving Feyenoord, Parker went on trial with English clubs Bradford City, and Chesterfield.

International career
Parker played at the 1995 FIFA U-17 World Championship, making three appearances in the tournament.

He earned eight caps for the Canadian senior team between 1998 and 2000. In an April 1999 friendly match against Northern Ireland, Parker scored an own goal.

References

1980 births
Living people
Association football defenders
Association football midfielders
Canadian soccer players
Canada men's international soccer players
Canada men's youth international soccer players
Canadian expatriate soccer players
Feyenoord players
Soccer players from Toronto
Sportspeople from Scarborough, Toronto